Lubecko  is a village in the administrative district of Gmina Kochanowice, within Lubliniec County, Silesian Voivodeship, in southern Poland.

The village has a population of 822.

First written mention about Lubecku come from with 1226 year. 
Church was built here, most probably, beginning of the 14th century. 
In 1716, there was found the miraculous image of the Virgin Mary.
From 1921 Lubecko belonged to Poland.
In 1944 Lubecko was bombed, by mistake, by US air-forces. Almost half the village destroyed and 6 persons died.
In December 2009, in Lubecko's church were uncovered exquisite wall paintings (frescoes) back to the early 14th century.
More details (in Polish) and pictures are available at http://www.lubecko.republika.pl

References

Lubecko